Events from the year 1467 in France

Incumbents
 Monarch – Louis XI

Events
 15 June – Philip the Good is succeeded as Duke of Burgundy, by Charles the Bold.

Births
 Philip of Cleves, bishop (died 1505)
 Guillaume Budé, scholar (died 1540)
 Philippa of Guelders, Noblewoman (died 1547)

Deaths
 Philip the Good, Duke of Burgundy (born 1396)
 John, Count of Angoulême, nobleman (born 1399)

References

Links

1460s in France